The 2023 Nigerian Senate elections in Yobe State will be held on 25 February 2023, to elect the 3 federal Senators from Yobe State, one from each of the state's three senatorial districts. The elections will coincide with the 2023 presidential election, as well as other elections to the Senate and elections to the House of Representatives; with state elections being held two weeks later. Primaries were held between 4 April and 9 June 2022.

Background
In the previous Senate elections, only one of the three incumbent senators was returned with Bukar Ibrahim (APC-East) retiring while Mohammed Hassan (PDP-South) was unseated in the general election. In the South district election, Ibrahim Mohammed Bomai (APC) defeated Hassan with 56% of the vote while Ibrahim Gaidam held the East district for the APC with 88%. In the East district, Ahmad Lawan (APC) won re-election with just 72% of the vote. The senatorial results were a continuation of APC control in the state as the party also gained won all House of Representatives seats, won a majority in the House of Assembly, and won the gubernatorial election along with Buhari winning the state in the presidential election.

Overview

Summary

Yobe East 

The Yobe East Senatorial District covers the local government areas of Bursari, Geidam, Gujba, Gulani, Tarmuwa, and Yunusari. Incumbent Ibrahim Gaidam (APC), who was elected with 88.2% of the vote in 2019, is seeking re-election.

General election

Results

Yobe North 

The Yobe North Senatorial District covers the local government areas of Bade, Jakusko, Karasuwa, Machina, Nguru, and Yusufari. Incumbent Ahmad Lawan (APC), who was elected with 72.5% of the vote in 2019, is seeking re-election.

General election

Results

Yobe South 

The Yobe South Senatorial District covers the local government areas of Damaturu, Fika, Fune, Nangere, and Potiskum. Incumbent Ibrahim Mohammed Bomai (APC), who was elected with 56.5% of the vote in 2019, is seeking re-election.

General election

Results

Notes

See also 
 2023 Nigerian Senate election
 2023 Nigerian elections
 2023 Yobe State elections

References 

Yobe State senatorial elections
2023 Yobe State elections
Yobe State Senate elections